The Kinner C-7 Envoy was an American four-seat cabin monoplane built by Kinner Airplane & Motor Corporation in the 1930s.

Design and development
The Envoy was a four-seat version of the Sportwing. It had low wings fitted with wire bracing from fuselage points just below the cabin windows. The conventional, fixed tailwheel undercarriage was fitted with streamlined spats on the main gear. The low-set tailplane was braced by wires from the middle of the fin.

Four civil examples were completed from 1934. These were fitted with a 300 h.p. Kinner C-7 engine and were sold to civil pilot owners. The civil aircraft were followed in 1936 by three aircraft for the United States Navy (USN) for use in communications work and designated XRK-1. The USN machines served until the early years of World War II. The Imperial Japanese Navy evaluated a single example as the LXK.

When they were delivered the USN examples were fitted with a 340 h.p. Kinner R-1044-2 engine, but one example used for VIP transport was later fitted with a 400 h.p. Pratt & Whitney R-985-38 radial engine.

The C-7 was the last of Kinner's production models.

Operators

United States Navy

Specifications (XRK-1)
Sources : Swanborough, 1990, p. 502 and Aerofiles

See also

References
Notes

Bibliography

External links

 Aerofiles information and three images of the Envoy series

1930s United States civil utility aircraft
1930s United States military utility aircraft
Low-wing aircraft
Single-engined tractor aircraft
Aircraft first flown in 1934